The bearer of the sword or sword-bearer was one of the minor officials of the royal household in the Kingdom of Hungary.

List of known office-holders

Bearer of the sword for the prince

References

Sources 

  Zsoldos, Attila (2011). Magyarország világi archontológiája, 1000–1301 ("Secular Archontology of Hungary, 1000–1301"). História, MTA Történettudományi Intézete. Budapest. 

Hungarian noble titles